Progerin (UniProt# P02545-6) is a truncated version of the lamin A protein involved in the pathology of Hutchinson–Gilford progeria syndrome. Progerin is most often generated by a sporadic single point nucleotide polymorphism c.1824 C>T (GGC -> GGT, p.Gly608Gly) in the gene that codes for matured Lamin A. This mutation activates a cryptic splice site that induces a mutation in premature Lamin A with the deletion of a 50 amino acids group near the C-terminus. The endopeptidase ZMPSTE24 cannot cleave between the missing RSY - LLG amino acid sequence (as seen in the figure) during the maturation of Lamin A, due to the deletion of the 50 amino acids which included that sequence. This leaves the intact premature Lamin A bonded to the methylated carboxyl farnesyl group creating the defective protein Progerin, rather than the desired protein matured Lamin A. Approximately 90% of all Hutchinson–Gilford progeria syndrome cases are heterozygous for this deleterious single nucleotide polymorphism within exon 11 of the LMNA gene causing the post-translational modifications to produce Progerin. Lamin A constitutes a major structural component of the lamina, a scaffold of proteins found inside the nuclear membrane of a cell; progerin does not properly integrate into the lamina, which disrupts the scaffold structure and leads to significant disfigurement of the nucleus, characterized by a globular shape. Progerin activates genes that regulate stem cell differentiation via the Notch signaling pathway. Progerin increases the frequency of unrepaired double-strand breaks in DNA following exposure to ionizing radiation. Also, overexpression of progerin is correlated with an increase in non-homologous end joining relative to homologous recombination among those DNA double-strand breaks that are repaired. Furthermore, the fraction of homologous recombination events occurring by gene conversion is increased. These findings suggest that the normal untruncated nuclear lamina has an important role in the proper repair of DNA double-strand breaks.

Point Mutation 
c.1824 C>T (GGC -> GGT, p.Gly608Gly) is the single point nucleotide polymorphism that occurs in most patients with progeria. The mutation occurs in the region G608 in exon 11 causing the sporadic mutation resulting in the amino acid glycine GGC to an alternative version of glycine GGT known as Gly608Gly. This single nucleotide C -> T polymorphism encodes for exon 11 to delete the 50 essential amino acid groups in the maturation of Lamin A. This deletion is then what causes the mutation of premature Lamin A to become the defective protein Progerin.

Premature Aging 
The defective gene in HGPS Progerin has effects on accelerated aging effects due to the conformational stress Progerin has on the cell membrane. Matured Lamin A is a protein that maintains the cell's structural stability along with other functions. The insertion of Progerin protein rather than the normal functioning matured Lamin A results in DNA damage along the cellular membrane causing stress which activates the protein p53 resulting in premature cellular senescence causing the rapid aging effects you see in HGPS.

Lonafarnib 
Researchers are exploring lonafarnib (a farnesyltransferase inhibitor) as a potential pharmacological therapy against the negative effects of Progerin on nuclear morphology in HGPS. lonafarnib, so far is currently the only FDA approved treatment for HGPS.

Other Information 
Recently, rapamycin has been shown to prevent Progerin aggregates in cells and hence delay premature aging.

Progerin, which has been linked to normal aging, is produced in healthy individuals via "sporadic use of the cryptic splice site".

References

Aging-related proteins
Human proteins